The United Revolutionary Front of East Turkestan (URFET) was a Uyghur nationalist group in Xinjiang that participated in the Xinjiang conflict as an armed separatist force. It was led by Yusupbek Mukhlisi, who operated in-exile with other former URFET members in Almaty, Kazakhstan.

The group was allegedly supported logistically by the Soviet Union until 1989. In September 2001, the URFET merged with the Uyghur Liberation Organisation (ULO) and became the Uyghurstan People's Party.

References

China–Soviet Union relations
East Turkestan independence movement
Organizations with year of disestablishment missing
Organizations with year of establishment missing
Secessionist organizations in Asia